The International Rubber Hall of Fame recognizes the careers of notable professionals in rubber technology. It is jointly sponsored by the Maurice Morton Institute of Polymer Science at The University of Akron and the Rubber Division of the American Chemical Society.

The Goodyear Polymer Center at the University of Akron houses the Hall of Fame's portrait gallery.

Inductees
The following are members of the International Rubber Hall of Fame:

Norman Bekkedahl
Walter Bock
Wallace Carothers
Peter Debye
John Boyd Dunlop
John D. Ferry
Paul Flory
Charles Goodyear
Charles Greville Williams
Thomas Hancock
William Draper Harkins
Carl Harries
Samuel E. Horne, Jr.
Frederick Kipping
Gerard Kraus
Werner Kuhn
Herman Francis Mark
Melvin Mooney
Maurice Morton
Leonard Mullins
Giulio Natta
George Oenslager
Ivan Ostromislensky
Joseph C. Patrick
Henry Nicholas Ridley
Ronald Rivlin
Adolf Schallamach
William J. Sparks
Hermann Staudinger
Michael Szwarc
David Tabor
Robert M. Thomas
Robert William Thomson
William A. Tilden
L. R. G. Treloar
George S. Whitby
Karl Ziegler

See also 
 Charles Goodyear Medal: Another ACS rubber award
 Melvin Mooney Distinguished Technology Award: Another ACS rubber award
 International Rubber Science Hall of Fame: Another ACS award
 Rubber Chemistry and Technology: An ACS journal
 List of chemistry awards

References

External links
Awards page of ACS Rubber Division

Science and technology hall of fame inductees
Rubber
University of Akron
International Rubber Science Hall of Fame
Halls of fame in Ohio
Materials science awards
Science and technology in Ohio
Science-related lists